Men's Slalom World Cup 1992/1993

Final point standings

In Men's Slalom World Cup 1992/93 all results count.

Note:

In the last race only the best racers were allowed to compete and only the best 15 finishers were awarded with points.

External links
FIS-ski.com - World Cup standings - Slalom 1993

World Cup
FIS Alpine Ski World Cup slalom men's discipline titles